En-men-gal-ana appears as the second king of Bad-tibira in some version of the Sumerian King List. According to that literary composition, En-men-gal-ana ruled for 28,800 years. The kings on the early part of the SKL are usually not considered historical, except when they are mentioned in Early Dynastic documents. En-men-gal-ana is not one of them.

References 

|-

Antediluvian Sumerian kings